The Primera División de Fútbol Profesional Clausura 2004 season (officially "Torneo Clausura 2004") started on January 24, 2004.

The season was composed of the following clubs:

 C.D. FAS
 Municipal Limeño
 San Salvador F.C.
 C.D. Águila
 C.D. Luis Ángel Firpo
 A.D. Isidro Metapán
 C.D. Atlético Balboa
 Alianza F.C.
 Arcense
 Chalatenango

Team information

Personnel and sponsoring

Managerial changes

Before the season

During the season

Clausura 2004 standings

Play off

Promotion/relegation playoff 1st Leg

Promotion/relegation playoff 2nd Leg

Chalatenango relegated and Once Lobos Promoted

Semifinals 1st Leg

Semifinals 2nd Leg

Final

List of foreign players in the league
This is a list of foreign players in Clausura 2004. The following players:
have played at least one apetura game for the respective club.
have not been capped for the El Salvador national football team on any level, independently from the birthplace

C.D. Águila
  Dario Larrosa
  Anderson da Silva
  Paulo Medina
  Luis Almada

Alianza F.C.
  Martin Garcia
  Ariel Fontela
  Yari Silvera
  Alejandro Curbelo
  Luis Fernando Espindola

Atletico Balboa
  Juan Carlos Mosquera
  Ernesto Noel Aquino
  Carlos Asprilla
  Victor Balanta

Arcense
  Martín Uranga
  Jorge Wagner
  Juan La Vaca
  John Polo
  Luciano Quinteros

Chalatenango
  Nicolás Muñoz 
  Diego Alvarez
  Libardo Carvajal
  José Luis Gónzález 
  William Vargas
  Alexander Obregon

 (player released mid season)
  (player Injured mid season)
 Injury replacement player

C.D. FAS
  Victor Hugo Mafla
  Williams Reyes
  Alejandro Bentos
  Marcelo Messias
  Antonio Serrano

C.D. Luis Ángel Firpo
  Manuel Abreu
  Óscar Abreu Mejía
  Ricardo Machado de Oliveira
  Alejandro Cuneo
  Mauro Caju
  Paulo César Rodríguez
  Jose Mauro Laurindo

A.D. Isidro Metapán
  Juan Carlos Reyes
  Alcides Bandera
  Andrés Bazzano
  Juan Bicca
  Wilson Sanchez

Municipal Limeno
  Gabriel Kinjo
  Nito Gonzales
  Eugenio Valerio
  Marcelo Marquez dos Santos
  Jorge Sandoval
  Carlos Escalante

San Salvador F.C.
  Franklin Webster
  Oscar Vallejo
  Alexander Obregón
  Henry Sevillano
  Rodrigo Lagos

External links
 

Primera División de Fútbol Profesional Clausura seasons
El
1